Andakilsá is a river in West Iceland (Vesturland).

The river has its origin in Skorradalsvatn lake. Three small rivers flow from the direction of the Skarðsheiði mountain massif into Andakilsá on its way to the sea, the Borgarfjörður. Summer discharge of Andakilsá is 3-13 m3/sec., winter discharge 5-22 m3/sec.

Salmon river
Salmon angling is often practised in Andakilsá though the fish can just mount about 5 km and not further as to the hydroelectric power station.  Trout angling is also possible near the bridge

Hydroelectric power station Andakilsvirkjun
Some waterfalls, the Andakilsárfossar, have more or less disappeared after construction of a 8 MW hydroelectric power station in 1946–47.

In 2017, it was decided to empty the small reservoir next to the power station. But a big amount of sediment accompanied the water and it was feared for the salmon.

Road No. 50

The Road No. 50 crosses the river Andakilsá on a bridge near the coast of Borgarfjörður.

References

Rivers of Iceland